Kfar Tapuach (lit., Apple-village) is an Orthodox Jewish Israeli settlement in the West Bank, founded in 1978. It sits astride Tapuach Junction, one of the major traffic junctions in the West Bank. The executive director of the village council is Yisrael Blunder, and the chief rabbi is Shimon Rosenzwieg.

The international community considers Israeli settlements in the West Bank illegal under international law, but the Israeli government disputes this.

History
According to ARIJ, Kfar Tapuach was established in 1978 on land which Israel had confiscated from the Palestinian town of Yasuf.

Demographics
Although its population consists entirely of Jews, Kfar Tapuach is one of the more diverse Israeli settlements, with its population coming from a range of backgrounds. Founded by a core of Habbani Yemenite Jews from the moshav of Bareket, it has since absorbed Jewish immigrants from Russia and the United States, a large group of Peruvian converts to Judaism from Trujillo, Peru, and others. Between February 2004 and August 2009, over 90 new families moved to Kfar Tapuach.

Public services
Four synagogues, two of which have three minyanim (prayer gatherings) daily and evening Torah classes; all four are fully functional on Shabbat.
Two Mikvaot (ritual baths), one for women and one for men.
A nursery school, and three kindergartens with a playground.
A qualified and experienced volunteer emergency medical and anti-terrorist team.

Private businesses
Private businesses include a grocery store, mechanic garage, moving company, goat farm, honey bee farm, Klaf (leather parchment) factory, and a perfume factory.

Biblical Tappuah
Kfar Tapuach is located near the archaeological site of Tapuach (Tappuah or Tapuah), which appears in the Bible in the Book of Joshua as one of the first 31 cities conquered by Joshua Bin-Nun and the children of Israel.

 places Tapuach at the border between the territory of the two sons of Joseph, i. e., the tribes of Manasseh and Ephraim:
The border [of Manasseh] went along south to the inhabitants of En Tappuah. Manasseh had the [rural] land of Tappuah, but Tappuah on the border of Manasseh belonged to the children of Ephraim.

Kahanism 
Kfar Tapuach is noted for its concentration of followers of the late Rabbi Meir Kahane.

See also
 Binyamin Ze'ev Kahane
 David Ha'ivri
 Kahanism
 Meir Kahane
 Mike Guzovsky
 Eden Natan-Zada

References

External links
 Tapuach Playground Project
 NYTimes Israel and U.S. Can’t Close Split on Settlements
 Olive wars, 2014, BBC

Kahanism
Populated places established in 1978
Religious Israeli settlements
Shomron Regional Council
1978 establishments in the Israeli Military Governorate
Peruvian diaspora
Israeli settlements in the West Bank